Oxeneers or the Lion Sleeps When Its Antelope Go Home is the debut album by Seattle-based post-hardcore band These Arms Are Snakes, released on September 21, 2004, on Jade Tree Records.

Track listing

 "Idaho" ends at 5:35. An untitled hidden track starts at 6:36.
 The Japanese pressing of the album includes the EP This Is Meant To Hurt You as bonus tracks.

Personnel

Band members
Brian Cook – bass guitar, microKORG, vocals and pump organ
Ryan Frederiksen – guitar, pump organ and design
Steve Snere – vocals and microKORG
Erin Tate – drums and percussion

Additional personnel
Matt Bayles – additional guitar and percussion, production and engineering
Alan Douches – mastering at West West Side Music
Derik Frederikson – recording assistance
Mark Gajadhar – additional drums
Demian Johnston – additional guitar
Dave Knudson – additional guitar
Ben Verellen – additional bass
Robin Laananen - Photography

Vinyl information
1st Press:
547 Translucent Red Marble
546 White
549 Opaque Royal Blue

2nd Press:
314 Translucent Blue

References

2004 albums
Albums produced by Matt Bayles
Jade Tree (record label) albums
These Arms Are Snakes albums